

Review and events

Pre–2015

Matches

Legend

Friendlies

Indonesia Super League

Statistics

Squad 
.

|}

Transfers

In

Out

References

External links 
 Persiba Balikpapan's website 

Persiba Balikpapan
Persiba Balikpapan